Fallicambarus harpi, the Ouachita burrowing crayfish, is a species of crayfish in the family Cambaridae. It is known only in southwest Arkansas. The species is a primary burrower, located in low lying seepage areas in pastures, yards and lawns.

The IUCN conservation status of Fallicambarus harpi is "NT", near threatened. The species may be considered threatened in the near future. The IUCN status was reviewed in 2010.

References

Further reading

 

Cambaridae
Articles created by Qbugbot
Crustaceans described in 1985
Taxa named by Horton H. Hobbs Jr.